Gary Michael Thomas Doherty (born 31 January 1980) is an Irish former professional footballer who played as a defender, having previously also played as a forward. He gained international honours for the Republic of Ireland.

He began his career at Luton Town before having a spell with Tottenham Hotspur in the Premier League, however, most of his career was with Norwich City, for whom he won the player of the year award. He finished his career with Wycombe Wanderers.

Club career

Luton Town
Doherty started his league career with Luton Town in 1997. He made 88 appearances in total over less than three seasons with the Hatters and became a Republic of Ireland international.

Tottenham Hotspur
Doherty was bought by Luton old boy David Pleat then Director of Football at Tottenham Hotspur for £1million in March 2000. He made his Spurs debut as a substitute in a 3–1 defeat at Manchester United in May 2000. He played in the team regularly during the 2000–01 season and scored his first goal against Newcastle United on 2 January 2001. Other highlights that season include a late winner against Leyton Orient in the FA Cup, giving his team the lead against North London rivals Arsenal in the 2001 FA Cup semi final. and scoring twice as Spurs came back from 2–0 down away to Sunderland to win 3–2. However, the following season started badly when he broke his leg in a League Cup match against Torquay United in September following a challenge from Eifion Williams. He returned before the end of the season but found it hard to break back into the side.

At Tottenham, Doherty eventually settled into a defensive role, and although he enjoyed probably his best spell after the turn of the year in 2003–04, he did not manage to consistently reach the form he exhibited before breaking his leg. Doherty signed a new contract of undisclosed length in March 2004. He was eventually sold by Tottenham's new management team of Frank Arnesen and Jacques Santini at the start of the 2004–05 season to newly promoted Norwich City for an undisclosed fee.

Norwich City
At Norwich City Doherty's career started well, with him having a regular place at the heart of the defence, but he lost his place in February to Jason Shackell and Norwich were eventually relegated. The following season, however, saw Doherty established as a regular choice at centre-back and his form and consistency improved considerably. Although Norwich had a difficult and disappointing 2005–06 season, the supporters recognised Doherty's contribution by voting him Norwich City player of the year.

Doherty signed a new contract at Carrow Road until summer 2008. The 2007–08 season also started off poorly for Doherty and was injured for 2 months in October. Doherty's contract expired, but he signed a new two-year deal on 1 July. He subsequently announced that his new squad number, 12, instead of 27 is intended to bring him luck:
"It's all about superstition. Since I came to Norwich, my goal tally's been rubbish really. I used to wear 12 at Luton and Tottenham, and I used to be quite free-scoring during those times."

During the Canaries' 2008–09 pre-season tour, Doherty picked up an ankle injury that ruled him out for the first three months of the season. Having returned to the side, he scored his first league goal for more than three years on Boxing Day 2008 in a 3–1 defeat to Crystal Palace at Selhurst Park.

Although Doherty was given the captaincy at the start of the 2009–10 season by Bryan Gunn, new manager Paul Lambert dropped him from the role immediately; and he was told he had no long-term future at the club. However, due to injuries Lambert was forced to recall Doherty to the side, and after this Doherty remained in the side for the rest of the season. He formed tight defensive partnerships with both Michael Nelson and Jens Berthel Askou and also scored seven goals in the process helping Norwich City to the League one title.

Doherty was named "man of the match" following Norwich's game against Leeds United on 27 March 2010.

At the end of the 2009–10 season, Doherty was named third in the player of the season award list, but on 14 May 2010 it was announced that he had been released by Norwich City. His agent Brendan Keyes was in talks with New York Red Bulls to bring Gary to MLS and a deal looked imminent but with terms not agreed Doherty stayed in England.

Charlton Athletic
On 5 July 2010, it was announced that Doherty had signed for Charlton Athletic after being released on a free transfer from Norwich City. Doherty became a regular in the Charlton side during the 2010–11 season but only made three appearances for the club in the 2011–12 season.

Wycombe Wanderers (loan)
On 24 February 2012, Doherty moved alongside Charlton teammate Paul Hayes to Wycombe Wanderers, who at the time, sat bottom of League 1. He was one of four new loanees that featured in the 5–0 win over Hartlepool. Doherty scored in the game to cap an impressive debut. He was later awarded with the Sponsor's Man of the Match.

Wycombe Wanderers
On 3 July 2012, Doherty signed for Wycombe Wanderers on a two-year contract after being released from Charlton. On 9 July 2012, Doherty was given the captain's armband. After two seasons with Wycombe, Doherty was forced to retire due to a knee injury sustained in the 2014–15 pre season.

International career
Doherty moved with his family to Luton in England at the age of six, but he came through the youth system of his native country, playing for the Republic of Ireland national under-19 football team in the 1997 UEFA European Under-18 Football Championship finals in Iceland scoring against France. He was also part of the UEFA Under-18 Championship winning side in 1998, and the Under-20 side that got to the last 16 of the 1999 FIFA World Youth Championship.

Doherty primarily played as a forward for his country, making his international debut against Greece in April 2000. He was becoming a regular in the squad when he broke his leg in September 2001. He recovered in April 2002, scoring his first international goal against the United States, but he missed out on the squad for the 2002 FIFA World Cup finals. Doherty returned to the team for Ireland's unsuccessful Euro 2004 qualifying campaign, where he top scored with three goals. He played centre half numerous times for Ireland

In popular culture
Doherty is affectionately known by many fans as either "The Doc" or "Ginger Pelé" (which was immortalised by the publication of the football song/chants book: One Ginger Pele).

The 2010 song "Gary Doherty", by Norwich band "We Can't Dance", makes reference to newspapers giving Doherty a hard time and has a chorus consisting of his name, ending with the line "I don't care what they say about you anyway".

Career statistics

Club

International

Honours
Norwich City
Football League One: 2009–10

Individual
PFA Team of the Year: 2009–10 League One
Norwich City F.C. Player of the Year: 2006

References

External links

1980 births
Living people
Association footballers from County Donegal
Republic of Ireland association footballers
Republic of Ireland youth international footballers
Republic of Ireland international footballers
Association football defenders
Luton Town F.C. players
Tottenham Hotspur F.C. players
Norwich City F.C. players
Charlton Athletic F.C. players
Wycombe Wanderers F.C. players
Premier League players
English Football League players
People educated at Cardinal Newman Catholic School, Luton